is a mountain in Nishinomiya, Hyōgo, Japan. It is located in the east end of the Rokko Mountains, and the height is 309.2m.

Outline 
Mount Kabuto is a famous picnic spot in the Kansai metropolitan area. It is a monadnock of an extinct volcano that was estimated to have last erupted about 12,000,000 years ago. This mountain is in the Kabutoyama Forest Park.

History 
The mountain is shaped like a helmet, 'kabuto' in Japanese. It has a long history as an object of worship by people around the mountain. Kanno-ji in the middle of the mountain is the place of worship of the mountain. 

According to Japanese myth, it is understood that because Empress Jingū buried her helmet when she went to subjugate Silla, a dynasty in the Korean Peninsula, this mountain was named 'Kabutoyama', literally "helmet mountain."

Access 
 Nigawa Station of Hankyū Imazu Line
 Kōyōen Station of Hankyū Kōyō Line

Gallery

References
 Nishinomiya Tourist Bureau
 Kabutoyama Forest Park
 Official Home Page of the Geographical Survey Institute in Japan

Kabutoyama
Inselbergs of Asia